RC Bystrc is a Czech rugby club in Brno. As the name implies, they are based in the Bystrc district of the city. They currently play in the KB Extraliga, having won the KB První Liga in 2008.

History
Rugby in the then Czechoslovakia was much affected following the nationwide restructuring of Physical Education and Sport in 1953. The Sokol Zbrojovka Brno club split in two, Spartak Zbrojovka Brno (now Dragon Brno) and Slavia VŠ Brno.

The club played in the Řečkovice, Pisárky, Tuřany, and Kníničky areas of Brno as well as the town of Šlapanice and the village of Troubsko, before finally managing to secure their present home ground, the Sportovní areá Ondreje Sekory, at Bystrc.

Honours
 První KB Liga
 2008

Historical names

 1953 - 1959 Slavia VŠ Brno
 1960 - 1975 Slavia VSŽ Brno
 1976–1981 Ingstav Brno
 1982–1999 Lokomotiva-Ingstav Brno
 2000 – RC Bystrc

Current squad

Team Management
 Head Coach: Pavel Vrána
 Assistant Coach: Roman Bačík
 Conditioning Coach: Karel Walter

External links
  RC Bystrc

Czech rugby union teams
Sport in Brno
Rugby clubs established in 1953